Penny's Bay Highway is a section of expressway on Lantau Island in Hong Kong. The road links North Lantau Highway to Hong Kong Disneyland Resort and Penny's Bay Quarantine Centre in Penny's Bay. It is approximately 1.5 km, starting from the North Lantau Highway's junction in Yam O and ending at Penny's Bay to link with Magic Road (to Hong Kong Disneyland Resort) and Sunny Bay Road (to Yam O).

The road was opened in 2005 to connect Hong Kong Disneyland, which opened in the same year, to the rest of Hong Kong via the Hong Kong Strategic Route and Exit Number System. From the north terminus at North Lantau Highway, it passes parallel to Sunny Bay Road through a valley before reaching its southern terminus, a roundabout intersecting with Sunny Bay Road and Magic Road.

Major intersections

See also
List of expressways in Hong Kong

Other expressways and major road infrastructure on Lantau Island include:

 North Lantau Highway
 Lantau Link
 Route 8 (Hong Kong)

External links
Google Maps of Penny's Bay Highway

Expressways in Hong Kong
Extra areas operated by NT taxis